Vikadal or Vikedal is a small village in the municipality of Kvam in Vestland county, Norway.

References

Villages in Vestland
Kvam